Pool It! is the tenth studio album by the Monkees, issued by Rhino Records in 1987. It was the first Monkees studio album of new material since Changes in 1970 and the first Monkees album to feature Peter Tork since the 1968 Head soundtrack.

Production
While Micky Dolenz, Davy Jones and Peter Tork had reunited the previous year for a 20th anniversary tour, with Micky and Peter contributing vocals to three tracks for the 1986 compilation album Then & Now... The Best of The Monkees, Pool It! served as the band's first proper "reunion album". Much like the group's early work, the writing of the album was largely handled by outside writers and the instrumentation by session musicians, with the Monkees themselves contributing lead vocals and Peter Tork providing guitar for his own song, "Gettin' In". Michael Nesmith chose not to participate in the album, although he had made a surprise appearance on stage with the band at the Greek Theatre in Los Angeles on September 7, 1986.

Release
The book The Monkees Tale by Eric Lefcowitz claims Pool It! and its two singles were recorded by "Dolenz, Tork & Jones", as opposed to "The Monkees". However, the billing on the LP itself is attributed to "Peter, Micky, Davy — The Monkees". The Monkees, however, have worked largely as a cumulative project since their fourth studio album, under various combinations of the four members. 

A deluxe CD/DVD version of the album was released on April 24, 2012, by Friday Music, along with a "180 gram audiophile vinyl" copy of the original album. The CD included Peter Tork's "MGBGT" (the live B-side to the "Heart and Soul" single) and the remixed single version of "Every Step of the Way" as bonus tracks. The DVD included the contents of the 1988 video cassette Heart & Soul: The Official Monkee Videography, featuring videos for "Heart and Soul", "Every Step of the Way" and "Don't Bring Me Down", along with interviews and more.

Promotion
Two promotional music videos were produced for Pool It!:

The first video was for "Heart and Soul", filmed in Los Angeles on July 5 and 6, 1987. The video, which stylistically borrows heavily from the Monkees TV series, begins in an ice factory in 1967, with the song "Last Train to Clarksville" playing in the background. Inside the ice factory, Davy, Micky and Peter are found frozen in blocks of ice and wearing their outfits from the television show. The video fast-forwards to 1987, where the three Monkees are thawed and learn how much has changed since the late 1960s. They decide to produce a music video in an effort to land a job and, after some comic mishaps, the video producers hand the Monkees what they claim is their video. When their prospective employer sees the video, it turns out to be taped over with a cooking show, which impresses the employer who then hires the band to work in a kitchen. The video for "Heart and Soul" was banned from airplay on MTV, due to a dispute over the Monkees bowing out of an MTV Super Bowl special, although it received rotation on other cable outlets, including Nickelodeon.

The second video was for "Every Step of the Way", filmed in Los Angeles on October 9, 1987. In this video, Davy, Micky and Peter are dressed in leather gang outfits and, as the song's lyrics suggest, "hang out in [an] alley way", as an unspecified woman, the apparent object of Davy's affections, wanders in and out of the alley. Meanwhile, Micky mimes a performance on drums with trash cans, Peter mimes guitar with a broom and Davy sings into a carrot and later mimes a saxophone solo into a lead pipe. The video is also interspersed with footage of the Monkees' 1987 concert tour and concludes with on-screen dialogue detailing the ultimate fates of the girl and the three Monkees. "Every Step of the Way" debuted on Nickelodeon's Nick Rocks on November 6, 1987.

Reception
The album was not a particular commercial or critical success, only reaching No. 72 on the Billboard 200. Only one single from the album, "Heart and Soul", managed to make the Billboard Hot 100 chart, peaking at No. 87. The follow-up single, a remixed version of "Every Step of the Way", failed to chart.

The album cover was featured on the Pitchfork Media list of "The Worst Record Covers of All Time".

Track listing

Personnel

The Monkees
Davy Jones – vocals
Micky Dolenz – vocals
Peter Tork – vocals, guitar ("Gettin' In")

Additional musicians
Curly Smith – drums
Mark Christian – guitar
George Hawkins – bass
Davey Faragher – bass
Mike Egizi – keyboards, programming
Craig Ostbo – percussion
Roger Bechirian – percussion, synthesizer ("Gettin' In")
Andy Cahan – piano ("(I'll) Love You Forever")
Lou Natkin – guitar ("Every Step of the Way", "(I'll) Love You Forever", "She's Movin' in With Rico")
Dan Sawyer – acoustic guitar ("Counting on You", "(I'll) Love You Forever")
Dave Sutton – bass ("She's Movin' in With Rico")
Jim Thompson – sax ("Secret Heart", "Every Step of the Way") 
Matt Harris – background vocals ("Heart and Soul", "Every Step of the Way")

Technical
Roger Bechirian – producer, arrangements, engineer, mixing
Robert Salcedo – engineer, mixing
Harold Bronson – executive producer
Lou Naktin – musical supervisor
Cliff Kane – assistant engineer
Scott Gordon – assistant engineer
Bernie Grundman – mastering
Gary Burden – art supervision, design
Don Brown – art supervision
Henry Diltz – photography
Delana Bettoli – photo illustration
Lisa Sutton – graphics assistance
Maria Berry – graphics assistance
Mike Egizi – string arrangements

Charts

References

1987 albums
The Monkees albums
Albums produced by Roger Bechirian
Rhino Records albums